Ronald James Giles (17 October 1919 – 30 January 2010) was an English first-class cricketer active 1937–59 who played for Nottinghamshire. He was born in Chilwell.

References

English cricketers
Nottinghamshire cricketers
1919 births
2010 deaths
People from Chilwell
Cricketers from Nottinghamshire